Lyndon State Forest covers  in Lyndon, Vermont in Caledonia County. The forest is managed by the Vermont Department of Forests, Parks, and Recreation for timber resources and wildlife habitat. 

Activities in the park include bird watching, hunting, snowshoeing, berry picking, and cross country skiing.

References

External links
Official website

Vermont state forests
Protected areas of Caledonia County, Vermont
Lyndon, Vermont